Dancing in Cambodia and at Large in Burma is a collection of essays by Indian writer Amitav Ghosh. It was published in 1998. The new edition of the book consist of five essays: Dancing in Cambodia, At Large in Burma, Stories in Stone, The Town by the Sea and September 11.

References

1999 non-fiction books
Indian essay collections
20th-century Indian books
Books by Amitav Ghosh
Books about Cambodia
Books about Myanmar